HMS Arab was the French 20-gun corvette Jean Bart, launched in 1793. The British captured her in 1795 and the Royal Navy took her into service. She was wrecked in 1796.

French service and capture
Jean Bart was built to a design by Pierre Duhamel; she was due to be renamed Installée in May 1795, but was captured before that could happen. She cruised the Channel, the North Sea, and the Atlantic as far as New York.

In 1795 Jean Bart was under the command of Lieutenant de vaisseau Néel. In March she captured the West Indiaman  as Active was sailing from Bristol to Jamaica. The French took Actives crew on board Jean Bart and then sank Active.

They captured Jean Bart, which accounts describe as having 18 guns and a crew of 110 men, or 20 guns and 120 men.  shared in the prize.

Jean Bart was sailing to Brest with dispatches from the French minister in the United States. In a deposition, Guillaume François Néel of Saint Malo testified that he had been the captain of Jean Bart at her capture, and that she had had 118 persons aboard, one of whom was an American; all the rest were French. Néel stated that he had thrown a packet containing the dispatches overboard but that it had floated rather than sunk, and that a boat from  had retrieved it.

The Admiralty took Jean Bart into the Royal Navy as HMS Arab. She was named and registered on 6 October 1795. Between July and December the Navy had her fitted at Portsmouth for £515. She was commissioned in October 1795 under Commander Stephen Seymour.

British service and loss
Seymour sailed Arab for the Channel, where she joined the squadron under Sir John Borlase Warren. On 9 June she sighted a cutter and a brig and set off in pursuit, but lost them in the night. Next morning she sighted land, but before she could turn, she struck a rock near the Glénan islands. She could not pull herself off the reef before so much water had poured in that she had to be abandoned. Captain Seymour drowned as did others of her crew. In addition to Seymour, the sinking cost the lives of her surgeon and 20 seamen. The French captured the 80 or so survivors. The French exchanged the seven surviving officers, who arrived at Plymouth on 13 July on the cartel Displai.

Citations and references
Citations

References

External links
 

 

1793 ships
Ships of the Royal Navy
Maritime incidents in 1796
Captured ships
Corvettes of the French Navy